The Oman TiT, or Taipei TiT Tower Square, is a residential skyscraper located in Wanhua District, Taipei, Taiwan.

Design 
Designed by the Taiwanese architectural group Taipei International Group, under the requirements of preventing earthquakes and typhoons common in Taiwan, the design resembles that of Burj Al Arab in Dubai, United Arab Emirates, symbolizing plain sailing and prosperity. The first to fifth floors and the podium are used as shopping malls, and the sixth floor is a public facility space, featuring a library, indoor swimming pool and gym for residents. The seventh to twenty-seventh floors of the building house 111 apartment units with independent entrances and exits. In February 2020, Don Quijote, Japan's largest discount store chain, rented the mall on the 1st to 3rd floors at a monthly rent of NT$4.62 million as its first store in Taiwan.

See also 
 List of tallest buildings in Taipei
 Ximending
 Burj Al Arab
 Tao Zhu Yin Yuan
 One Park Taipei
 Huaku Sky Garden

References

2012 establishments in Taiwan
Apartment buildings in Taiwan
Postmodern architecture in Taiwan
Residential buildings completed in 2012
Residential skyscrapers in Taiwan
Skyscrapers in Taipei